The 2008 FIA GT Brno 2 Hours was the seventh round of the 2008 FIA GT Championship season.  It took place at the Brno Circuit, Czech Republic, on 14 September 2008.

Race results
Class winners in bold.  Cars failing to complete 75% of winner's distance marked as Not Classified (NC).  Cars with a C under their class are running in the Citation Cup, with the winner marked in bold italics.

Statistics
 Pole Position – #33 Jetalliance Racing – 1:51.675
 Average Speed –

References

Brno